KNK may refer to:

 Kara no Kyōkai, a light novel series by Kinoko Nasu
 KNK (band), South Korea
 Library of Congress Classification KNK for Law of Brunei
 Northern Kentucky University Herbarium
 Kuranko language of Sierra Leone, ISO 639 code
 ISO 3166-2 code KN-K, for St. Kitts
 Konferenz Nationaler Kultureinrichtungen, Conference of National Cultural Institutions, East Germany
 German KNK series of breeder reactors
 National Convergence "Kwa Na Kwa", Central African Republic political party
 Il-Kunsill Nazzjonali tal-Ktieb, the Maltese-language name of Malta's National Book Council
 Kurdistan National Congress